Majlis Sukan Angkatan Bersenjata Diraja Brunei (English: Royal Brunei Armed Forces Sports Council) or simply MS ABDB is  the multi-sport club of the Royal Brunei Armed Forces.  Its football team, MS ABDB FT, play in the Brunei Super League, the top division of Brunei football. They are holding the record number of league championships (4) and FA Cup wins (7) in Brunei football.

Current squad

Coaching staff

Team managers

Coaches

Achievements

Fair Play DST Super League: 2
 2014, 2015

Best Player DST Super League: 3
 2014 – Sld (U) Mohammad Mazazizi bin Mazlan
 2015 – Sld Abdul Azizi bin Ali Rahman
 2016 – Sld Mohd Tarmizi bin Hj Mat Johari

Top Scorer DST Super League: 1
 2016 – Sld Abdul Azizi bin Ali Rahman - 8 goals
 2017 – Sld Abdul Azizi bin Ali Rahman - 28 goals

Top Scorer

Player records

All-time top goalscorers

External links
Official website

References

Football clubs in Brunei
Association football clubs established in 1985
1985 establishments in Brunei
MS ABDB
Military association football clubs